José Rafael Román Sarita (born May 21, 1963, in Santo Domingo, Dominican Republic) is a former Major League Baseball pitcher who played for three seasons.

Career
After spending 1981 to 1983 in the minors, Román pitched for the Cleveland Indians from 1984 to 1986, pitching in 14 career games. He would spend 1987 and 1988 in the minors for the Indians and New York Mets organizations, and played in the Chinese Professional Baseball League for the Brother Elephants from 1990 to 1992.

References

External links

1963 births
Living people
Cleveland Indians players
Dominican Republic expatriate baseball players in the United States

Major League Baseball pitchers
Major League Baseball players from the Dominican Republic
Batavia Trojans players
Waterloo Indians players
Buffalo Bisons (minor league) players
Maine Guides players
Tidewater Tides players
Jackson Mets players